Bringing Mary Home is an album by the progressive bluegrass band The Country Gentlemen, recorded in 1966.

Track listing 
 Bringing Mary Home (John Duffey, Larry Kingston, Chaw Mank)
 Down Where the River Bends (Jack Anglin, Johnnie Wright)
 Battle Hymn of the Republic (Traditional)
 Banks of the Ohio (Traditional)
 Brown Mountain Light (Scotty Wiseman)
 Northbound 
 This World's No Place to Live
 Girl from the North Country (Bob Dylan)
 A Cold Wind A' Blowin'
 Spanish Two Step (Bob Wills)
 Uncle Joe (Eddie Adcock)
 Let the Light Shine Down

Personnel 
 Charlie Waller - guitar, vocals
 John Duffey - mandolin, vocals
 Eddie Adcock - banjo, vocals
 Ed Ferris - bass, vocals

References

External links 
 https://web.archive.org/web/20091215090142/http://www.lpdiscography.com/c/Cgentlemen/cgent.htm

1966 albums
The Country Gentlemen albums
Rebel Records albums
Albums produced by Charlie Waller (American musician)
Albums produced by John Duffey
Albums produced by Eddie Adcock